Malmö FF competed in Allsvenskan, Svenska Cupen and The UEFA Cup for the 2003 season.

Players

Squad stats

|}

Competitions

Allsvenskan

League table

Matches

Club

Kit

|
|

Other information

Notes

References
 

Malmö FF seasons
Malmo FF